Pushmataha is an unincorporated community in Choctaw County, Alabama, United States.  It was named in honor of famed Choctaw chief Pushmataha.  Much of the community is part of the Pushmataha Historic District, listed on the Alabama Register of Landmarks and Heritage in October 2008.

Pushmataha's population as an unincorporated community was listed as 124 at the 1880 U.S. Census, the only time a figure was returned.

Geography

Demographics

References

Unincorporated communities in Alabama
Unincorporated communities in Choctaw County, Alabama
Alabama placenames of Native American origin